In mathematics, an exact category is a concept of category theory due to Daniel Quillen which is designed to encapsulate the properties of short exact sequences in abelian categories without requiring that morphisms actually possess kernels and cokernels, which is necessary for the usual definition of such a sequence.

Definition
An exact category E is an additive category possessing a class E of "short exact sequences": triples of objects connected by arrows
 
satisfying the following axioms inspired by the properties of short exact sequences in an abelian category:
 E is closed under isomorphisms and contains the canonical ("split exact") sequences:

(We say that the admissible epimorphisms are "stable under pullback", resp. the admissible monomorphisms are "stable under pushout".);
 Admissible monomorphisms are kernels of their corresponding admissible epimorphisms,  and dually.  The composition of two admissible monomorphisms is admissible (likewise admissible epimorphisms);
 Suppose  is a map in E which admits a kernel in E, and suppose  is any map such that the composition  is an admissible epimorphism.

One can speak of an exact functor between exact categories exactly as in the case of exact functors of abelian categories: an exact functor  from an exact category D to another one E is an additive functor such that if

is exact in D, then

is exact in E.  If D is a subcategory of E, it is an exact subcategory if the inclusion functor is fully faithful and exact.

Motivation
Exact categories come from abelian categories in the following way.  Suppose A is abelian and let E be any strictly full additive subcategory which is closed under taking extensions in the sense that given an exact sequence

We can take the class E to be simply the sequences in E which are exact in A; that is,

is in E iff

is exact in A.  Then E is an exact category in the above sense.  We verify the axioms:
 E is closed under isomorphisms and contains the split exact sequences: these are true by definition, since in an abelian category, any sequence isomorphic to an exact one is also exact, and since the split sequences are always exact in A.
 Admissible epimorphisms (respectively, admissible monomorphisms) are stable under pullbacks (resp. pushouts): given an exact sequence of objects in E,

 Every admissible monomorphism is the kernel of its corresponding admissible epimorphism, and vice versa: this is true as morphisms in A, and E is a full subcategory.
 If  admits a kernel in E and if  is such that  is an admissible epimorphism, then so is : See .

Conversely, if E is any exact category, we can take A to be the category of left-exact functors from E into the category of abelian groups, which is itself abelian and in which E is a natural subcategory (via the Yoneda embedding, since Hom is left exact), stable under extensions, and in which a sequence is in E if and only if it is exact in A.

Examples
 Any abelian category is exact in the obvious way, according to the construction of #Motivation.
 A less trivial example is the category Abtf of torsion-free abelian groups, which is a strictly full subcategory of the (abelian) category Ab of all abelian groups.  It is closed under extensions: if

By the construction of #Motivation, Abtf is an exact category; some examples of exact sequences in it are:

This category is not abelian.
 The following example is in some sense complementary to the above.  Let Abt be the category of abelian groups with torsion (and also the zero group).  This is additive and a strictly full subcategory of Ab again.  It is even easier to see that it is stable under extensions: if

Thus it is an exact category.

References
 

 

Additive categories
Homological algebra